Malini Murjani is a Manhattan-based accessories designer. She is the daughter of fashion mogul Mohan Murjani. Her handbags and belts are sold by Bergdorf Goodman, Saks, and Bloomingdale's.

References

External links
Behind the Seams, Nirali Magazine, March 2007
Malini Murjani Web Site

Living people
Year of birth missing (living people)
American fashion designers
American women fashion designers
Place of birth missing (living people)
21st-century American women